Zonalnoye Airport (also known as Kirovskoye South)  is an airport in Sakhalin Oblast, Russia,  southeast of Tymovskoye. It accommodates small airliners. A  overrun off the southern edge may have been a former airfield.

References

Airports built in the Soviet Union
Airports in Sakhalin Oblast